Alexander Grant (1830 – April 30, 1900) was a merchant and political figure in Nova Scotia, Canada. He represented Pictou County in the Nova Scotia House of Assembly from 1890 to 1897 as a Liberal-Conservative member.

He was born in Pictou County, Nova Scotia, the son of Hugh Grant, a Scottish immigrant, and was educated at the Academy there. Grant was a school commissioner, municipal councillor and mayor of Stellarton.

References 
The Canadian parliamentary companion, 1897 JA Gemmill

1830 births
1900 deaths
Progressive Conservative Association of Nova Scotia MLAs
Mayors of places in Nova Scotia